The 1961 World Table Tennis Championships women's doubles was the 25th edition of the women's doubles championship.
Maria Alexandru and Georgita Pitica defeated Chiu Chung-hui and Sun Mei-ying in the final by three sets to two.

Results

See also
 List of World Table Tennis Championships medalists

References

-
1961 in women's table tennis